Manos sucias is a 2014 American-Colombian thriller drama film directed by Josef Wladyka and starring Cristian James Abvincula, Jarlin Javier Martinez and Hadder Blandon.  Spike Lee served as an executive producer of the film.

Cast
Cristian James Abvincula as Delio
Jarlin Javier Martinez as Jacobo
Hadder Blandon as Miguel
Manuel David Riascos as Jorge

Reception
The film has a 92% rating on Rotten Tomatoes.

References

External links
 
 

American thriller drama films
Colombian thriller films
2010s American films